Receptor activator of nuclear factor κ B (RANK), also known as TRANCE receptor or TNFRSF11A, is a member of the tumor necrosis factor receptor (TNFR) molecular sub-family.  RANK is the receptor for RANK-Ligand (RANKL) and part of the RANK/RANKL/OPG signaling pathway that regulates osteoclast differentiation and activation.  It is associated with bone remodeling and repair, immune cell function, lymph node development, thermal regulation, and mammary gland development.  Osteoprotegerin (OPG) is a decoy receptor for RANKL, and regulates the stimulation of the RANK signaling pathway by competing for RANKL.  The cytoplasmic domain of RANK binds TRAFs 1, 2, 3, 5, and 6 which transmit signals to downstream targets such as NF-κB and JNK.

RANK is constitutively expressed in skeletal muscle, thymus, liver, colon, small intestine, adrenal gland, osteoclast, mammary gland epithelial cells, prostate, vascular cell, and pancreas.  Most commonly, activation of NF-κB is mediated by RANKL, but over-expression of RANK alone is sufficient to activate  the NF-κB pathway.

RANKL (receptor activator for nuclear factor κ B ligand) is found on the surface of stromal cells, osteoblasts, and T cells. Mutations affecting RANK have been associated with infantile malignant osteopetrosis in humans, mice and cats.

Structure 

RANK is a 616 amino acid type I transmembrane protein.  Its extracellular domain consists of 184 amino acids, its transmembrane domain has 21 amino acids, and its cytoplasmic domain consists of 383 amino acids. Like other members of the TNFR family, it has four extracellular cysteine-rich pseudo-repeat domains (CRDs).  It shares 40% amino acid identity with CD40.  RANK is encoded on human chromosome 18q22.1.  It shows 85% homology between mouse and human homologues.

There are two monomers of RANK related by noncrystallographic 2-fold symmetry perpendicular to the long axis of the molecules in the asymmetric unit.  RANK contains four CRDs spanning a length of 100 Angstroms which makes it the longest member of the TNFR family to date.

The binding of RANKL to RANK trimerizes the receptor and activates a signaling pathway.  The RANK-RANKL complex forms a heterohexameric complex.  Only two of the four RANK CRDs are in direct contact with the RANKL.  The majority of the complex's residues are hydrophilic. Unlike other members of the TNFSF, each surface interaction in RANK-RANKL is continuous.

Function

Osteoclastogenesis 

TRAF6 has been shown to be imperative to the RANK-related osteoclastogenesis pathway.  RANKL binds to RANK, which then binds to TRAF6.  TRAF6 stimulates the activation of the c-jun N-terminal kinase (JNK) and nuclear factor kappa-b (NF-κB) pathways which trigger differentiation and activation of osteoclasts.  This system is balanced by the relative expression of OPG to RANKL, which are highly regulated by many factors including hormones, immune signals, and growth factors.  An overexpression of RANKL can cause an overproduction and activation of osteoclasts, which break down bone.  The balance between RANKL and OPG is a target for therapy in many diseases including estrogen deficiency-associated osteoporosis, rheumatoid arthritis, Paget's disease, periodontal disease, and bone tumors and malignancies.

Thermoregulation 

RANK has also been shown to be a key in the thermoregulation signaling in females, which seems to be regulated by ovarian sex hormones.  RANK is expressed in key regions of the brain associated with thermoregulation.  Inactivation of RANK in these regions causes a loss of fever response to increased levels of RANKL.  It has also been shown to be a critical mediator of fever response to lipopolysaccharide-induced fever and pro-inflammatory cytokines IL-1B and TNFa.  This key role of the RANK-RANKL system may link the osteoporosis and hot flashes seen as symptoms of hormonal changes in post-menopausal women.

Mammary gland development 

RANK is constitutively expressed in mammary epithelial tissues.  Calcium transferred from mother to fetus and neonate is provided by the degradation of the female bone by increased osteoclastic activity, which is regulated by the RANK/RANKL axis.  RANKL also works through RANK to provide proliferative and survival signals to promote  the final stages of lactating mammary gland development.  Dysfunctional RANK or RANKL causes the arrest of differentiation and expansion of the alveolar bunds into mature lobulo-alveolar mammary structures, disabling the production of milk.

Clinical significance

Cancer 

RANK and RANKL have been reported to be expressed in some breast cancer and prostate cancer cell lines.  RANKL expression in infiltrating T cells within mammary carcinomas activate RANK-expressing neoplastic mammary epithelial cells which stimulate metastasis.  The expression of RANKL in these cells and the expression of RANK in bone cells may be the biological presentation of Paget's seed and soil idea.  The affinity for RANK of RANKL may be the reason these cancers tend to metastasize to bone.  Once the tumor is seeded in the bone, the tumor cells stimulate bone resorption by secreting factors such as RANKL or prompting the surrounding stroma to express growth factors.  These growth factors then upregulate production of RANKL which leads to osteoclastogenesis and bone destruction.  The destruction of bone releases more growth factors and RANKL which induces more osteoclastogenesis, triggering a vicious cycle of bone destruction that is seen in metastatic bone tumors.

Targeted therapies 

Most therapies that target the RANK/RANKL/OPG axis aim to either down-regulate expression of RANKL or upregulate the expression of the decoy receptor OPG.  For example, denosumab is a fully human monoclonal antibody that is directed against RANKL. In phase I and II trials, denosumab led to a decrease in bone resorption in multiple myeloma, prostate cancer and breast cancer patients.  Another study looked into developing small mimetics based on the structure of OPG that bind to RANK as well as RANKL and cause defective coupling between the two.

Interactions 

RANK has been shown to interact with:
 TRAF1, 
 TRAF2, 
 TRAF3,
 TRAF5,  and
 TRAF6.

See also 
 RANKL
 Osteoprotegerin
 Osteoimmunology

References

Further reading

External links 
 

Clusters of differentiation
TNF receptor family